Barolineocerus apiculus is a species of leafhopper native to French Guiana. It is named for the unusual apex of the male subgenital
plate.  It is distinguished from other species in the genus by the unusual male subgenital plate, the bold projections from the anal tube, and the thickened reproductive organ.

References

Insects described in 2008
Hemiptera of South America
Eurymelinae